Hell of the Living Dead is a 1980 Italian horror film directed by Bruno Mattei. The film is set in a laboratory in Papua New Guinea that releases a dangerous chemical, turning the technicians and locals into zombies. A French news reporter (Margit Evelyn Newton) and her crew land on the island to investigate.

Hell of the Living Dead was a project developed by producers and given to director Bruno Mattei, who attempted to create a film similar to Dawn of the Dead but lighter in tone. It was shot in five weeks in Spain with a script that was not Mattei's first choice and a score by the band Goblin, taken from other film scores that the band had performed.
The film generally received negative reviews, noting bad dialogue and its obvious derivation of 1978's Dawn of the Dead.

Plot
At a top-secret chemical research facility called Hope Center #1, a rat causes a chemical leak and dies. As two workers investigate, the rat suddenly comes back to life and kills one of the men, who likewise revives and attacks his co-workers. Subsequently, the entire staff of the plant turns into flesh-eating zombies.

A four-man team of Interpol commandos, consisting of Lt. Mike London, Osborne, Zantoro, and Vincent, are deployed to eliminate a group of eco-terrorists who have taken hostages at the US Embassy in Barcelona, Spain. The terrorists demand the closing of all the Hope Centers, which both the government and the military deny exist. Under orders of the local authorities, the press does not publicize the terrorists' demands or mention the disaster at Hope Center. After another team pumps tear gas into the building, Lt. London and his three commandos burst in, killing the terrorists.

Once the mission is completed, the team loses contact with Hope Center #1. Thinking that terrorists have infiltrated the complex, the team flies to Papua New Guinea. There, they meet journalist Lia Rousseau and her cameraman Max, who are investigating a series of mysterious, violent attacks on the locals. While stopping at a native village, they encounter several zombies. The commandos and the journalists travel through the New Guinea jungle in the commando's jeep, trying to survive while evading the zombies. The group takes refuge at an abandoned plantation, only to come under attack from the zombie residents. The walking dead kill and eat Osborne, forcing the survivors to flee.

Rousseau and London's men battle their way to a beach, escape by raft, and finally arrive at Hope Center #1, where they find all of the workers either dead or roaming the facility as zombies. The zombies kill Max and Zantoro and infect London. Rousseau and Vincent learn about the experimental chemical accidentally released, which is causing the zombie infestation. Rousseau theorizes that the chemical, codenamed "Operation Sweet Death", has been invented to curb the Third World population by driving it into eating each other. She vows to tell the world, but a horde of zombies – including their now zombified comrades – close in and devour the last survivors of the team.

Sometime later, the zombie contagion has spread beyond New Guinea's borders and throughout the world. While politicians and scientists dispute the matter, a young couple in the developed world is attacked and devoured by a horde of zombies in a city park.

Cast

Production
Director Bruno Mattei noted that the production began as a specific request from the producer. Mattei planned to make a film inspired by 1978's Dawn of the Dead, but wanted a lighter tone for the film. Mattei said that initially two screenplays were written, and that the producers rejected the screenplay that Mattei preferred. The film was Mattei's first to be made under the name Vincent Dawn, a request made specifically by the film's Spanish production side.

Claudio Fragasso stated he wrote Hell of the Living Dead with Rossella Drudi, his frequent co-scripter. Fragasso felt there had been several zombie films made recently, and wanted to do something different after watching Dawn of the Dead suggesting the film would be like Soylent Green as well as envisioning the film as "an undead epic, a kind of Apocalypse Now".

Among the cast was Margit Evelyn Newton as Lia. Newton recalled that she felt a great sense of responsibility at the time, playing the film's protagonist. Newton felt nervous in a scene involving nudity in front of the indigenous people. She asked that everyone be removed from the set, with only indispensable cast and crew remaining. The scene was shot in one day.

Hell of the Living Dead was shot in 5 weeks. The film includes stock footage to suggest that the film was set in New Guinea. Fragasso stated that when the crew arrived in Barcelona to shoot the film they found they had no money and had to improvise and rewrite the previous script. The production had this footage from the beginning of shooting the film and had rebuilt some of the locations from the stock footage in Spain, where the film was shot.  Fragasso commented on the use of stock footage in the film as producers wanted to reuse footage they had, which led to Mattei adding footage of a documentary New Guinea, Island of Cannibals into the film. Parts of the film were improvised on set, such as when a character enters a room imitating Gene Kelly in his film Singing in the Rain. The score is credited to the band Goblin, but is mostly taken from other film scores Goblin performed, such as Dawn of the Dead and Contamination. Mattei was a fan of their music and secured rights to it for the film through Carlo Bizio. Fragasso stated that the music was from other films and from their album Roller as Goblin were too expensive at the time to get for an original score.

Release
Hell of the Living Dead was released in Spain in November 1980 and in Italy in August 1981 and released in the United States in 1983. It was described as "moderately profitable" in Glenn Kay's book Zombie Movies: The Ultimate Guide. It has been released under several titles, including Virus, Night of the Zombies and Zombie Creeping Flesh.

Critical reception
In a contemporary review, Steve Jenkins (The Monthly Film Bulletin) noted that the possibility of a subversive subtext involving Third World victims corrupted by scientific research was "truly buried here in an orgy of flesh chewing and vomiting, as well as dialogue that beggars belief." The review commented positively that the film had unexpected pleasures, such as "the ludicrous attempts to dub speech on to stock footage (featuring humans) and a story, low-budget UN meeting consisting of a handful of delegates hurling pieces of paper at each other."

From retrospective reviews, Glenn Kay (Zombie Movies: The Ultimate Guide) also noted the poor dialogue, as well as bad shot composition—with scenes changing from day to night between cuts, slow pacing and overacting. AllMovie described the film as "cluelessly bad" with a script of "dreadful characterizations and dialogue," noting that it would be enjoyed by fans of cult and trash cinema. John Kenneth Muir (Horror Films of the 1980s) stated the film was not enjoyable to watch and that it added little originality to the zombie genre in the vein of other films such as Return of the Living Dead and Day of the Dead. Both AllMovie and Muir noted the film's similarity to Dawn of the Dead, with Muir referring to it as "perhaps the most blatant rip-off of Dawn of the Dead ever produced".

Mattei later expressed that he felt the film's dialogue was "pretty stupid" and that like all his films, he would reshoot it if possible. When asked how she felt about the film in 2013, actress Margit Evelyn Newton responded that "Obviously seeing it now, I would change some things. But that is okay. Virus has helped me get more work." Fragasso commented on the film later saying that the film "designed with lots of love, but in the end it came out a test tube baby, a kind of abortion [...] But I'm satisfied with the end results."

See also
List of horror films of 1980
List of Italian films of 1980
List of Spanish films of 1980

References

Footnotes

Sources

External links
 
 

1980 films
1980 horror films
Apocalyptic films
Films about cannibalism
Italian zombie films
Films shot in Spain
Films directed by Bruno Mattei
Films scored by Goblin (band)
Films about viral outbreaks
Spanish zombie films
1980s Italian films
Italian exploitation films
Italian science fiction horror films
Italian splatter films
Italian action horror films
Films set in Papua New Guinea